Dumfries and Galloway Constabulary was the territorial police force responsible for Dumfries and Galloway, Scotland until 1 April 2013.

The police force was formed in 1948 as an amalgamation of the police forces of Dumfriesshire, Kirkcudbrightshire, and Wigtownshire, and preceded the creation of the former Dumfries and Galloway Regional Council by 27 years.

The last Chief Constable was Patrick Shearer QPM. Shearer was appointed on 24 April 2007, in succession to his predecessor David Strang who was made Chief Constable of Lothian and Borders Police. The Deputy Chief Constable was George Graham, who took over from Robert Ovens QPM on 1 January 2006.

An Act of the Scottish Parliament, the Police and Fire Reform (Scotland) Act 2012, created a single Police Service of Scotland – known as Police Scotland – on 1 April 2013. This merged the eight regional police forces in Scotland, together with the Scottish Crime and Drug Enforcement Agency, into a single service covering the whole of Scotland. Police Scotland's interim headquarters is at the Scottish Police College at Tulliallan in Fife.

Lockerbie bombing
On 21 December 1988, Pan Am Flight 103 exploded midair as a result of a bomb on board, and the wreckage crashed in the town of Lockerbie, within the police area of Dumfries and Galloway Constabulary.  In the UK, the event is referred to as the "Lockerbie air disaster", the "Lockerbie bombing", or simply "Lockerbie". Eleven townspeople were killed in Sherwood Crescent, where the plane's wings and fuel tanks plummeted in a fiery explosion, leaving a huge crater. The 270 fatalities (259 on the plane, 11 in Lockerbie) included citizens of 21 nations.

The subsequent police investigation, led by Dumfries and Galloway Constabulary, was the largest ever mounted in Scottish history and became a murder inquiry when evidence of a bomb was found. Two men accused of being Libyan intelligence agents were eventually charged in 1991 with planting the bomb. A further nine years were needed to bring the accused to trial. Abdelbaset al-Megrahi was jailed for life in January 2001 following an 84-day trial, which was held at Camp Zeist in the Netherlands, but under Scottish law. On 20 August 2009, al-Megrahi was freed on humanitarian grounds because of an apparent terminal prostate cancer.

Chief constables
1948–1965 – Sydney Arthur Berry
1965–1984 – Alexander Campbell
1984–1989 – John Boyd
1989–1994 – George Esson
1994–1996 – Roy Cameron (afterwards Chief Constable of Lothian and Borders, 1996–2002)
1996–2001 – William Rae
2001–2007 – David Strang
2007–2013 – Patrick Shearer

References

External links
 Dumfries and Galloway Constabulary

Dumfries and Galloway
Defunct police forces of Scotland
Government agencies established in 1948
1948 establishments in Scotland
2013 disestablishments in Scotland
Government agencies disestablished in 2013